Govt Polytechnic, Umri (GPU)  is a co-educational institution of higher learning located in the town of Umri, Kurukshetra in the region of Haryana. It was established in 2016 is affiliated with the Haryana State Board of Technical Education (HSBTE), Panchkula and approved by All India Council of Technical Education, New Delhi (AICTE) and the Department of Technical Education, Govt. of Haryana (DTE).

History
The concept of the diploma institute at Umri, Kurukshetra was first introduced in year 2010.

It is also a campus for two National Institute funded by the Central Government of India
National Institute of Design, Kurukshetra
National Institute of Electronics & Information Technology, Kurukshetra

Academic programs 
Govt Polytechnic, Umri, Kurukshetra offers three year diploma engineering courses in the following disciplines after 10th. The institute also offers lateral entry scheme in computer engineering course.  Medical and non-medical students of 10 +2 (passed) can take direct admission in the second year of this program.

See also
 List of universities in India
 Universities and colleges in India
 Education in India
 List of institutions of higher education in Haryana

References

All India Council for Technical Education
Engineering colleges in Haryana
Technical schools
Kurukshetra